Superfunk is a French electronic dance music group founded in 1998. They are leading Marseille artists along with DJ Jack de Marseille and DJ Fafa Monteco. Their breakout single in 2000 was "Lucky Star" which sampled Chris Rea and featured Ron Carroll.

On the 12th of August 2020, Stéphane Bonan aka Stéphane B died of cancer.

References

Musical groups established in 1998
Musical groups from Marseille
French electronic music groups
French house music groups